Memories of a Teenager (Spanish title Yo, Adolescente) is a 2020 Argentine teen drama film directed by Lucas Santa Ana. The movie stars Renato Quattordio, Malena Narvay, Thomás Lepera, and Jerónimo Giocondo Bosia. The movie premiered on July 23, 2020, on the Cine.Ar channel. Netflix acquired the rights to release the film on November 12 of the same year.

Plot 
Between 2004 and 2005 Nicolás "Zabo" Zamorano begins writing a blog about his daily life titled Yo, Adolescente (literally I, a Teenager) following the suicide of a close friend and a fire at a nearby concert that results in multiple deaths. Shortly after, Nicolás begins to question his sexuality, and becomes intimate with several people.

Cast 
 Renato Quattordio as Nicolás "Zabo" Zamorano
 Malena Narvay as Tina
 Thomás Lepera as Tomás
 Jerónimo Giocondo Bosia as Ramiro
 Walter Rodríguez Pez as Agustín
 Tomás Wicz as Checho
 Tomás Raimondi as Lucho
 Majo Chicar as Camila
 Agustina Cabo as María
 Gregorio Barrios as Fran
 Tomás Agüero as Pol
 María Lía Bagnoli as Mamá de Zabo
 Hernán Morán as Papá de Zabo
 Bruno Giganti as Mateo
 Carolina Unrein as Florencia

Awards and critical ratings

References 

2020 films
Argentine coming-of-age films
Films about adolescence
Argentine LGBT-related films
Argentine drama films
Films shot in Buenos Aires
2020 LGBT-related films
LGBT-related coming-of-age films